Harassed may refer to:

Harassment
Harassed (1964 film) (Acosada), a 1964 Argentine film
Harassed (1985 film) (Acosada), a 1985 Spanish film
Harassed (2002 film) (Acosada), a 2002 Mexican film